Bankikodla and Hanehalli are the twin neighbouring villages in a valley in Uttara Kannada district in the Indian state of Karnataka.

Just to the north of the village, the Gangavalli River joins the Arabian Sea. The town of Gokarna is just to the south of the village. The surrounding Sahyadri Mountains hug the Arabian sea with open fields providing recreational opportunities for the locals. It has creeks and shallow ponds and bridges, which are vulnerable in the rainy seasons. For religious or spiritual people, there are temples, church and a Masjid to worship in.

During British rule in India, the Chitrapur Saraswat Brahmins built Anandashram High School (1884) for their children, but a majority of them eventually moved out to Mumbai. The younger population is now moving out of the  village and the older generations, especially the retired communities, have started coming back to the village.

Location 
Bankikodla-Hanehalli lies between the Gangavali River and River Aghanashini and is situated along the Karwar coast of the Arabian Sea. It is near to the college towns of Kumta,  Ankola, Surathkal and Manipal.

Bankikodla-Hanehalli can be reached by buses and taxicabs from Kumta, Ankola and  Karwar on national highway 17( NH-17). Karnataka state road transport corporation runs buses from many places. Goa Airport, Hubli Airport and  Mangalore International Airport are the closest airports. It can be reached by the Konkan Railway on the Mumbai to Mangalore route. Kashi Vishwanatha Temple community center is at Nelaguni on the way to Gokarna.

Climate

Summer : Marc– mid June,
Rainy  : mid June–October
Winter : November–February.

Since the town is located on the coast, it has a moderate climate, with temperatures in the range of 28c to 36c during summer and 26c to 20c during winter.
The rainy season has heavy rains by the south-west monsoon. The average annual rainfall is about 3000 mm.

Population

Industries 

Handloom factory

Education

Anandashram High School, Bankikodla - established 1884

Temples 

Ammavara Devasthan 
Mukundi Devasthan
Bankanatheshwara Devasthan
Lakshmi Narayana Devasthan
Dugrambika Devasthan
Kashi Vishwanath Matt
Mahasati Devasathan

Notable personalities 

Gangadhar Chittal
Yashwant Chittal
Gopal Gaonkar
Arvind Nadkarni
Dayanand Nadkarni
Mangesh Nadkarni
Ramesh L. Nadkarni
Sundar Nadkarni

References

Villages in Uttara Kannada district